Indochinamon is a genus of freshwater crabs, typically found in the Indo-China region.

Species
 Indochinamon andersonianum (Wood-Mason, 1871)
 Indochinamon asperatum (Alcock, 1909)
 Indochinamon bavi Naruse, Nguyen & Yeo, 2011
 Indochinamon beieri (Pretzmann, 1966)
 Indochinamon bhumibol (Naiyanetr, 2001)
 Indochinamon boshanense (Dai & G.-X. Chen, 1985)
 Indochinamon changpoense (Dai, 1995)
 Indochinamon chinghungense (Dai, Y. Z. Song, He, Cao, Z. B. Xu & Zhong, 1975)
 Indochinamon cua (Yeo & Ng, 1998)
 Indochinamon dangi Naruse, Nguyen & Yeo, 2011
 Indochinamon daweishanense (Dai, 1995)
 Indochinamon edwardsii (Wood-Mason, 1871)
 Indochinamon flexum (Dai, Y. Z. Song, L. L. Li & Liang, 1980)
 Indochinamon gengmaense (Dai, 1995)
 Indochinamon guttum (Yeo & Ng, 1998)
 Indochinamon hirtum (Alcock, 1909)
 Indochinamon hispidum (Wood-Mason, 1871)
 Indochinamon jianchuanense (Dai & G.-X. Chen, 1985)
 Indochinamon jinpingense (Dai, 1995)
 Indochinamon kimboiense (Dang, 1975)
 Indochinamon lipkei (Ng & Naiyanetr, 1993)
 Indochinamon manipurense (Alcock, 1909)
 Indochinamon menglaense (Dai & Cai, 1998)
 Indochinamon mieni (Dang, 1967)
 Indochinamon orleansi (Rathbun, 1904)
 Indochinamon ou (Yeo & Ng, 1998)
 Indochinamon phongnha Naruse, Nguyen & Yeo, 2011
 Indochinamon prolatum (Brandis, 2000)
 Indochinamon tannanti (Rathbun, 1904)
 Indochinamon tritum (Alcock, 1909)
 Indochinamon villosum (Yeo & Ng, 1998)
 Indochinamon xinpingense (Dai & Bo, 1994)
 Indochinamon yunlongense (Dai, 1995)

References

External links

Potamoidea
Freshwater crustaceans of Asia